The South East Queensland derby is a rugby league rivalry between NRL clubs the Brisbane Broncos and Gold Coast Titans.

Head to Head

This table only includes competitive matches, excluding all pre-season trials

Results

Competitive meetings
Scores list home team first

Non-competitive meetings
Scores list home team first

Statistics

Most appearances

 Scott Prince played one game with the Brisbane Broncos in 2014

Top Point Scorers

Most points in a single game:
For Brisbane Broncos: 16
 Israel Folau (4 Tries), Brisbane Broncos 32 – 18 Gold Coast Titans, Round 10, 2009
For Gold Coast Titans: 14
Scott Prince (1 Try, 5 Goals), Gold Coast Titans 34 – 18 Brisbane Broncos, Round 20, 2009

Top Try Scorers

Most tries in a single game:
For Brisbane Broncos: 4
 Israel Folau (4 Tries), Brisbane Broncos 32 – 18 Gold Coast Titans, Round 10, 2009
For Gold Coast Titans: 3
Matthew Petersen (3 Tries), Gold Coast Titans 26 – 24 Brisbane Broncos, Round 6, 2008

Attendances
Highest attendance:
Brisbane Broncos at home: 48,621 – Brisbane Broncos 19 – 18 Gold Coast Titans, Round 17, 2007
Gold Coast Titans at home: 47,686 – Gold Coast Titans 28 – 16 Brisbane Broncos, Round 5, 2007
Lowest attendance:
Brisbane Broncos at home: 30,083 – Brisbane Broncos 30 – 10 Gold Coast Titans, Round 8, 2012
Gold Coast Titans at home: 15,432 – Gold Coast Titans 16 – 26 Brisbane Broncos, Round 5, 2015

Shared player history

See also

Rivalries in the National Rugby League

References

External links

Rugby league rivalries
Brisbane Broncos
Gold Coast Titans
Rugby league on the Gold Coast, Queensland
Rugby league in Brisbane
Sports rivalries in Australia
South East Queensland